Karayichev is a rural locality (a khutor) in Kotelnikovskoye Rural Settlement, Kotelnikovsky District, Volgograd Oblast, Russia. The population was 253 as of 2010. There are 7 streets.

Geography 
Karayichev is located on the bank of the Aksay Kurmoyarsky, 15 km east of Kotelnikovo (the district's administrative centre) by road. Lenina is the nearest rural locality.

References 

Rural localities in Kotelnikovsky District